HUMO is a popular Dutch-language Belgian weekly radio and television supermarket tabloid.

History and profile
Humoradio (meaning a portmanteau of 'humor' and 'radio' in English) was first published in 1936 as a Dutch-language counterpart to Le Moustique, now Télémoustique. During World War II between 1940 and 1944 Humoradio was not published. In 1958, when television started to reach a larger audience in the country, the magazine was renamed as Humo. The magazine is published on a weekly basis.

HUMO as it is recognized today started emerging from 1969 on, when Guy Mortier became its chief editor. He gave the magazine its playful comedic tone, put more emphasis on articles about rock music and shaped it into a magazine that appealed to a left-wing, progressive audience. During Mortier's term many classic columns, interview series, annual cultural events and comic strips that are still considered to be part of "Humo" today saw the day of light. Among those is the annual HUMO's Pop Poll, organized since 1967, which lets readers elect their favorite people, radio shows, TV shows, music groups,... of the year. Another recurring event is Humo's Rock Rally, an important Belgian contest for young rock bands,. Humo also sponsors the Rock Werchter festival since its conception in 1977. In 2003 Mortier retired.

HUMOs home cartoonist is Kamagurka, whose style influenced the overall cult appeal of the magazine. The magazine's mascots, Bert and Cowboy Henk, are creations by him, both featured in weekly comics series.

The owner of HUMO was Sanoma and was published by Sanoma magazines. In May 2015 the magazine was acquired by De Persgroep.

Circulation
Since 2002 HUMO has had a declining circulation rate. During the period of 2006-2007 the circulation of the magazine was 278,000 copies. The magazine sold 320,000 copies on 23 September 2008 when it offered a free copy of Goddamned Days on a Goddamned Planet which was an unpublished new novel of Flemish author Dimitri Verhulst. During the first quarter of 2009 the circulation of the magazine was 256,558 copies. The magazine had a circulation of 215,409 copies in 2010 and 197,105 copies in 2011. It was 166,732 copies in 2012. The 2013 circulation of the magazine was 150,232 copies.

Past and present contributors to "Humo"

Journalists
 Herman De Coninck
 Yves Desmet
 Marc Didden
 Guy Mortier
 Herman Selleslags
 Serge Simonart
 Rudy Vandendaele

Columnists
 Herman Brusselmans
 Willy Courteaux
 Patrick De Witte
 Arnon Grunberg
 Gerrit Komrij
 Tom Lanoye
 Hugo Matthysen
 Jan Mulder
 Kees van Kooten
 Guido Van Meir
 Rudy Vandendaele

Cartoonists
 Jonas Geirnaert
 Gummbah
 Jeroom
 Kamagurka (Bert, Cowboy Henk)
 Ever Meulen
 Herr Seele (Cowboy Henk)
 Peter van Straaten

References

External links
Official Site

1936 establishments in Belgium
Magazines published in Belgium
Weekly magazines published in Belgium
Dupuis titles
Dutch-language magazines
Satirical magazines published in Belgium
Magazines published in Flanders
Listings magazines
Magazines established in 1936
Music magazines
Television magazines